The 5th Annual Bengal Film Journalists' Association Awards were held on 1942, honoring the best in
India cinema in 1941.

Main Awards

Best India Film 
 Pratishruti
 Padosi
 Sikandar
 Naya Sansar
 Khazanchi
 Parichaya
 Punar Milan
 Pardesi
 Raj Nartaki
 Nandini

Best Director 
Hemchandra Chunder - Pratishruti

Best Actor 
Pahari Sanyal - Pratishruti

Best Actress 
Kanan Devi - Parichaya

Best Screenplay 
Binoy Chatterjee - Pratishruti

Hindi Film Section

Best Director 
V. Shantaram - Padosi

Best Actor 
Gajanan Jagirdar - Padosi

Best Actress 
Durga Khote - Charnon Ki Dasi

Best Screenplay 
K. A. Abbas - Naya Sansar

Foreign Film Section

Ten Best Film 
  - Citizen Kane
  - Kitty Foyle
  - Hold Back the Dawn
  - The Letter
  - The Philadelphia Story
  - Meet John Doe
  - Blossoms in the Dust
  - The Great Dictator
  - My Life with Caroline
  - Back Street

References 

Bengal Film Journalists' Association Awards
1942 film awards
1942 in Indian cinema